Yuehaimen station is a Metro station of Shenzhen Metro Line 9. It opened on 8 December 2019.

Station layout

Exits

References

External links
 Shenzhen Metro Yuehaimen station (Chinese)
 Shenzhen Metro Yuehaimen station (English)

Shenzhen Metro stations
Railway stations in Guangdong
Nanshan District, Shenzhen
Railway stations in China opened in 2019